Clarksville is an unincorporated community in Perry County, in the U.S. state of Ohio.

History
Clarksville was laid out in 1854 by Daniel Clark, and named for him.

References

Unincorporated communities in Perry County, Ohio
Unincorporated communities in Ohio
1854 establishments in Ohio
Populated places established in 1854